Water crises could refer to: 

Water security, a goal of water management and policy.
Water scarcity a shortage of water in a specific geography, such as the Cape Town water crisis
Drought the meteorological conditions created by lack of precipitation

Specific events
 Chinese water crisis
 Kenya water crisis
 1998 Klang Valley water crisis
 1998 Sydney water crisis
 Cape Town water crisis
 Water crisis in the Democratic Republic of the Congo
 Water crisis in Iran
 Water crisis in Honduras
 Flint water crisis

See also
 Peak water